Margot von Renesse (born 5 February 1940 in Berlin; died 17 June 2022) was a German politician.

Life 
Renesse studied German law at University of Münster. Since 1969 Renesse became member of German political party SPD. Since 1972 she worked as judge in Bochum. From 1990 to 2002 Renesse was a member of German Bundestag.
She was married and had four children. One of her sons Jan-Robert von Renesse became judge. She died in June 2022.

Awards 
 2004: Honorary degree by Ruhr University Bochum
 2004: Crosses of the Order of Merit of the Federal Republic of Germany

References

External links 
 Biography by Munzinger Online/Personen – Internationales Biographisches Archiv]

1940 births
2022 deaths
Politicians from Berlin
Members of the Bundestag for the Social Democratic Party of Germany
Members of the Bundestag 1990–1994
Members of the Bundestag 1994–1998
Members of the Bundestag 1998–2002
Members of the Bundestag for North Rhine-Westphalia
20th-century German women politicians
Commanders Crosses of the Order of Merit of the Federal Republic of Germany
21st-century German women politicians
University of Münster alumni
German untitled nobility